Blaggard's Moon is the fourth novel by American author George Bryan Polivka. It is a prequel to the Trophy Chase Trilogy, featuring one of the trilogy's minor characters, Smith, Delany, a sailor turned pirate. It details his adventures leading up to his signing on with pirate Scat Wilkins and his ship, the Trophy Chase.

Setting 
Blaggard's Moon is set in the same fictional world as the Trophy Chase Trilogy, with most of the action taking place in the Kingdom of Nearing Vast, on land and at sea.

Plot summary
The story opens with Smith Delaney abandoned and left to die, considering the life that led him there. As the action flashes back, the story details "the great battle between the pirates of the world, and the band of merciless men who would purge the seas." The love story of Damrick Fellows, the pirate hunter, and Jenta Stillmithers, paramour of pirates, unfolds in the tale.

References

American fantasy novels